The women's 200 metre breaststroke competition of the swimming events at the 2019 Pan American Games are scheduled to be held August 8th, 2019 at the Villa Deportiva Nacional Videna cluster.

Records
Prior to this competition, the existing world and Pan American Games records were as follows:

Results

Heats
The first round will be held on August 8.

Final B
The B final was also held on August 8.

Final A
The A final was also held on August 8.

References

Swimming at the 2019 Pan American Games
2019 in women's swimming